Jack Hudson may refer to:

 Jack Hudson (English footballer) (1860–1941), English international footballer
 Jack Hudson (Australian footballer) (born 1934), Australian rules footballer
 Jack Hudson, a character from the TV series Sue Thomas: F.B.Eye

See also
John Hudson (disambiguation)